Sir Donald Charles Hopson,  (31 August 1915 – 26 August 1974) was a British diplomat.

Hopson was educated at Christ's Hospital and University College, Oxford.  He was commissioned into the Lancashire Fusiliers in 1939. During World War II, he served across Europe, was mentioned in despatches, and received the Military Cross and the Distinguished Service Order. He joined the Foreign Service in 1945.

He was Ambassador to Laos from 1962 to 1965, Ambassador to Mongolia from 1965 to 1966, Chargé d'affaires to China from 1965 to 1968 (during which he was caught up in the arson attacks on the Chargé d'affaires Office in Peking, now Beijing, on 22 August 1967), Ambassador to Venezuela from 1969 to 1972, and Ambassador to Argentina from 1973 to 1975.

References

External links
The Papers of Sir Donald Hopson at the Churchill Archives Centre

Ambassadors of the United Kingdom to Laos
Ambassadors of the United Kingdom to Mongolia
Ambassadors of the United Kingdom to China
Ambassadors of the United Kingdom to Venezuela
Ambassadors of the United Kingdom to Argentina
Companions of the Distinguished Service Order
Knights Commander of the Order of St Michael and St George
1915 births
1974 deaths
Recipients of the Military Cross
Lancashire Fusiliers officers
People educated at Christ's Hospital
Alumni of University College, Oxford
British Army personnel of World War II